"You Can't Hold My Heart" is a song recorded by the South Korean boy group Monsta X. It was released on February 14, 2020, from their first English-language album All About Luv. It debuted and peaked at number 40 on the US Billboard Mainstream Top 40 Airplay, becoming Monsta X's second single to be on the said chart.

Background and release
The single was released on February 14, 2020, as part of Monsta X's album All About Luv. The music video was later released on April 17, 2020.

Music video 
The music video takes place in a bright red cube, while the members were seen walking on the ceiling and floating upside down, along with chests that emit clouds of smoke, which were color-coordinated with their outfits.

Critical reception 
Syd Briscoe of David Reviews gave both the song and its music video  as the minimalist film focuses on depicting each members in a mysterious red world as they float through the air or walk on the ceiling, and that the chilled-out sound and English lyrics are sure to entice more fans to the group, as well as the group's good looks and distinctive styles are placed front and center.

Charts

See also 
 List of K-pop songs on the Billboard charts

References

2020 songs
2020 singles
Starship Entertainment singles
Songs written by Anthony M. Jones
Songs written by Tommy Brown (record producer)
Song recordings produced by Tommy Brown (record producer)
Song recordings produced by Anthony M. Jones
Songs written by Jeff Gitelman
Songs written by Jon Bellion